Towards Zero is a 2007 French mystery film directed by Pascal Thomas and starring François Morel, Danielle Darrieux and Melvil Poupaud. It is an adaptation of the 1944 novel Towards Zero by Agatha Christie.

Cast
 François Morel -  Commissaire Martin Bataille 
 Danielle Darrieux - Camilla Tressilian 
 Melvil Poupaud - Guillaume Neuville 
 Laura Smet - Caroline Neuville 
 Chiara Mastroianni - Aude Neuville 
 Alessandra Martines - Marie-Adeline 
 Clément Thomas - Thomas Rondeau 
 Xavier Thiam - Frédéric Latimer 
 Hervé Pierre - Ange Werther 
 Vania Plemiannikov - Pierre Leca 
 Jacques Sereys - Charles Trevoz 
 Valériane de Villeneuve - Emma 
 Paul Minthe - Heurtebise 
 Carmen Durand - Barrette

References

External links

2007 films
French mystery films
2000s mystery films
2000s French-language films
Films directed by Pascal Thomas
Films based on British novels
Films based on works by Agatha Christie
2000s French films